Swoon may refer to:
Swoon hypothesis, a number of theories about the resurrection of Jesus Christ
Swoon (film), a film on the 1924 Leopold and Loeb murder case
Swoon (artist), a graffiti artist from New York City

Music
Swoon (Silversun Pickups album), the second album by Silversun Pickups
Swoon (Prefab Sprout album), the debut album by Prefab Sprout
"Swoon" (song), a 2010 single by The Chemical Brothers